is a Japanese term for historical young male sex workers.  were often passed off as apprentice kabuki actors (who often engaged in sex work themselves on the side) and catered to a mixed male and female clientele. For male clients, the preferred service was anal sex, with the client taking the penetrative role; homosexual fellatio is almost unmentioned in Edo period (1603–1867) documents. 

This term also appears in modern Japanese homosexual slang.

Gallery

See also

 Catamite
 Greek love
 History of human sexuality
 Homosexuality in pre-Meiji Japan
  (ja)
 Pederasty

References

Bibliography
 Bernard Faure "The Red Thread" 1998.

Kabuki
Japanese sex terms
History of human sexuality
Japanese words and phrases
 Kagema
 Kagema
Male prostitutes by type
Gendered occupations
LGBT history in Japan